Jean-Pierre Renan Bourhis (born 29 March 1995) is a French-Senegalese slalom canoeist who has competed at the international level since 2012. He finished 18th in the C1 event at the 2016 Summer Olympics in Rio de Janeiro. At the delayed 2020 Summer Olympics in Tokyo, he again competed in the C1 event, improving to 17th. Jean Pierre is currently studying at the renowned National Institute of Applied Sciences in Rennes. (INSA)

References

External links 

Jean Pierre BOURHIS at CanoeSlalom.net

1995 births
Living people
Sportspeople from Quimper
French male canoeists
Senegalese male canoeists
Canoeists at the 2016 Summer Olympics
Olympic canoeists of Senegal
Canoeists at the 2020 Summer Olympics